Cambridge City may refer to either of the following:

Cambridge City, Indiana, a town in the United States
Cambridge City F.C., an English football team